Hanfu also includes accessories, such as footwear. There were many etiquette which rule people's daily lives, and this included the use and etiquette of shoes and socks wearing.

Shoes 
Collectively, shoes are typically called lü (履) since the Han dynasty. In the Qin dynasty, shoes were referred as ju (屦). The word xie (鞋) eventually replaced the word lü to become a general name for shoes. 

Since the ancient times, Chinese shoes came in various kinds; there were leather shoes (made of tanbark and pelt), cloth shoes (made of silk, hemp, damask, brocade, and crepe), and straw shoes (made of leaves and stems of cattail, corn leaves, and kudzu), ji (屐; wooden clogs). Han Chinese typically wore lü (regular shoes), xi (shoes with thick soles), and ji (wooden clogs). Different shoes were worn based on their appropriateness for specific occasions; shoes also denoted the social ranks of its wearers. Lü (履) were worn for formal occasions whereas ji (屐) was used for informal occasions.

Gallery

See also 

 Hanfu
 List of Hanfu
 Lotus shoes
 Xiuhuaxie

References 

Hanfu
Shoes
Chinese footwear